Tenga is a town in Mozambique, near Maputo.

Transport 
It is served by a station on the national railway network.

Accident 
In the Tenga rail disaster a runaway caused a large number of fatalities.

See also 
 Railway stations in Mozambique

References 

Populated places in Cabo Delgado Province